Liyuanliao is an unmanned railway station on the Forestry Bureau Alishan Forest Railway line located in Meishan Township, Chiayi County, Taiwan.

History
The station was opened on 1 October 1912. After 1985, the station became unattended.

Architecture
The station is located 905 meters above sea level.

See also
 List of railway stations in Taiwan

References

1912 establishments in Taiwan
Alishan Forest Railway stations
Railway stations in Chiayi County
Railway stations opened in 1912